The 1989 Big Ten Conference baseball tournament was held at Ray Fisher Stadium on the campus of the University of Michigan in Minneapolis, Minnesota, from May 19 through 20. The top four teams from the regular season participated in the double-elimination tournament, the ninth annual tournament sponsored by the Big Ten Conference to determine the league champion.  won their first tournament championship and earned the Big Ten Conference's automatic bid to the 1989 NCAA Division I baseball tournament. Illinois was the first team other than Michigan and Minnesota to win the event.

Format and seeding 
The 1989 tournament was a 4-team double-elimination tournament, with seeds determined by conference regular season winning percentage only. Iowa claimed the second seed by tiebreaker over Illinois

Tournament

All-Tournament Team 
The following players were named to the All-Tournament Team.

Most Outstanding Player 
Rich Capparelli was named Most Outstanding Player. Capparelli was a pitcher for Illinois.

References 

Tournament
Big Ten baseball tournament
Big Ten Baseball Tournament
Big Ten baseball tournament